Markus Büchel (born 25 April 1961) is a Liechtenstein sprinter. He competed in the 100 metres at the 1984 Summer Olympics and the 1988 Summer Olympics.

References

1961 births
Living people
Athletes (track and field) at the 1984 Summer Olympics
Athletes (track and field) at the 1988 Summer Olympics
Liechtenstein male sprinters
Olympic athletes of Liechtenstein
Place of birth missing (living people)